Campo Carlo Magno (elevation 1682 m) is a pass in the Adamello-Brenta mountain region in Italy.
It connects the Val Rendena and the Val di Sole. To the west of the pass are the Adamello-Presanella mountains, to the east the Brenta Dolomites.

The pass is named after Charlemagne, who is said to have crossed the pass on his way to Rome in 800 AD for his coronation as emperor of the Holy Roman Empire.

It is a tourist location, as it has golf courses and the ski resort of Madonna di Campiglio.

See also
 List of highest paved roads in Europe
 List of mountain passes

External links
360° panoramic view

Mountain passes of Italy